KFRJ (91.1 FM) was a radio station broadcasting a religious format. Licensed to China Lake, California, it served the Ridgecrest, California broadcast area. The station was an affiliate of the Family Radio network, and was owned by Family Stations, Inc. The transmitter was located on El Paso Peak, south of Ridgecrest.

References

External links

FRJ
Family Radio stations
Radio stations established in 2005
2005 establishments in California
Defunct radio stations in the United States
Radio stations disestablished in 2019
2019 disestablishments in California
Defunct religious radio stations in the United States
FRJ